Landrecht (German language) means "law of the land", "state law", "land law" or "state jurisdiction". Specifically it may refer to the following:

Various laws:
  Landrecht, one of the two parts of the ancient Saxon Sachsenspiegel legal code, the other being Lehnsrecht
 Landrecht (medieval), the law of a state of the Holy Roman Empire in medieval and early modern times
 Bohemian Landrecht, until 1621 the highest court in the Kingdom of Bohemia
 Landrecht (Sweden), Sweden's first collection of laws that applied to the whole empire
 Allgemeines Landrecht für die Preußischen Staaten or "General state laws for the Prussian states"

Place(s):
 Landrecht (Steinburg), a parish in the district of Steinburg in Schleswig-Holstein, Germany

See also 
Landfriede
Ewiger Landfriede
Landgericht (medieval)